Anund of Sweden - rarely written as Anwynd in English - may refer to:

 Anund (died 640), legendary Swea ruler: Bröt-Anund - he who broke way for roads
 Anund Uppsale, legendary Swea ruler
 Anund Jacob of Sweden (died 1050), King of Sweden 1022
 Anund from Russia, Swedish king around 1070
 Anund, Swedish prince around 1056, son of King Edmund (name uncertain)